Contra Loma Regional Park is a  regional park in Contra Costa County, California. It is part of the East Bay Regional Parks system. It is located in the city of Antioch and includes an  reservoir.

 
The U.S. Bureau of Reclamation is updating its long-term plan for the Contra Loma Regional Park and the adjacent Antioch Community Park. The previous plan was written in 1975, before a population boom hit eastern Contra Costa County.

The reservoir, which is owned by the Contra Costa Water District (CCWD), is available for year-round fishing and a lifeguarded swim lagoon for summertime swimming. Fishing is allowed, but those who wish to fish must purchase a Daily Fishing Access Permit. There is also an access fee. The reservoir contains catfish, black and striped bass, bluegill, trout, and redear sunfish.

Biking is allowed. Alcoholic drinks are prohibited everywhere in the park.

References

External links
Contra Loma Reservoir and Recreation Area. Draft Resource Management Plan and Draft Environmental Impact Statement. U.S. Department of the Interior, Bureau of Reclamation. May 2014. Retrieved September 18, 2014.

East Bay Regional Park District
Antioch, California
Parks in Contra Costa County, California